Anawrahta (1014–1077) was the founder of the Pagan Empire.

Anawrahta or Nawrahta may refer to:

People
 Anawrahta I of Sagaing (1313–1339), or Shwetaungtet, king of Sagaing 1335/36 – 1339
 Anawrahta II of Sagaing (1326–1349), or Nawrahta Minye, king of Sagaing for seven months in 1349
 Bayinnaung Kyawhtin Nawrahta (1516–1581), king of the Toungoo Dynasty of Burma 1550–1581
 Nawrahta of Mrauk-U, king of the Mrauk-U Dynasty of Arakan for a few days in 1696
 Anawrahta of Launggyet, king of Arakan 1406–1408
 Nawrahta of Kanni (born  1300s), senior Myinsaing prince
 Nawrahta Minsaw or Anawrahta Minsaw, (1551/52–1607/08), king of Lan Na 1579 – 1607/08
 Maha Nawrahta (died 1767), Konbaung-era general
 Minkhaung Nawrahta (1714–1760), Konbaung-era general
 Ne Myo Nawrahta (fl. 1752–1757), Konbaung-era general and first mayor of Yangon

Other uses
 Anawrahta-class corvette, a class of corvettes operated by the Myanmar Navy
 Shwe Nawrahta, in the Burmese pantheon of nats
 Anawrahta Bridge, over the Ayeyawady River in Myanmar

See also

Burmese royal titles

Burmese royal titles